Biorka Island is an island near Sitka, Alaska. The National Weather Service has a radar there. The island is also a popular spot to watch sealions.

The original name in the Tlingit language for the island is Watsíxh ("Caribou").

Climate
Biorka Island has a subpolar oceanic climate (Köppen Cfc).

References

Islands of Alaska
Islands of Sitka, Alaska